Ghadam or Adam (ადამი) was a king of Iberia (Kartli, modern eastern Georgia) whose three years of reign are scarcely recorded in the medieval Georgian chronicles. He is otherwise unattested elsewhere. Professor Cyril Toumanoff suggests AD 132–135 as the possible years of Ghadam’s rule. The king’s name is surmised by modern scholars to be a corrupted form of Rhadamistus, not an uncommon name in the ancient Caucasian royal and noble families. 

According to the Georgian annals, Ghadam was the son of P’arsman the Good who is the Pharasmanes, king of the Iberians, of Cassius Dio and some other Classical authors. He died after three years of reign, leaving the regency of his one-year-old son, P’arsman, in the hands of his mother Ghadana of Armenia.

References 

Pharnavazid kings of Iberia
2nd-century monarchs in Asia